Elle is the Indian edition of the worldwide lifestyle magazine of French origin called Elle.

History and profile
The first issue of the Indian edition of Elle was the December 1996 issue. The magazine is published by Ogaan Publications Pvt. Ltd. Ogaan is based in Mumbai and has offices in New Delhi and Bangalore.

Editors
The following have served as Editors of Elle India:

Neerja Shah

Nonita Kalra

Aishwarya Subramanium

Supriya Dravid 

Kamna Malik 

Ainee Nizami Ahmedi (Present)

See also
 List of Elle (India) cover models

References

External links

Elle (magazine)
1996 establishments in Maharashtra
English-language magazines published in India
Women's magazines published in India
Magazines established in 1996
Mass media in Mumbai
Women's fashion magazines